War tourism is recreational travel to active or former war zones for purposes of sightseeing or historical study.  The term may be used pejoratively to describe thrill-seeking in dangerous and forbidden places. In 1988, P. J. O'Rourke applied the pejorative meaning to war correspondents.

Early warfare

War artists and war correspondents such as Willem van de Velde are considered to be the first war tourists. Van de Velde took to sea in 1653 in a small boat to observe a naval battle between the Dutch and the English, making many sketches on the spot.

Crimean War

During the Crimean War, tourists led by Mark Twain visited the wrecked city of Sevastopol – he even scolded his travel mates for walking off with souvenir shrapnel. Prince Menshikov invited the ladies of Sevastopol to watch the battle of Alma from a nearby hill. Fanny Duberly traveled with her husband to the Crimea in 1854 and stayed with him throughout his time there, despite the protests of commanders such as Lord Lucan. As the only woman at the front-lines, she was the center of much attention. She was told of planned attacks ahead of time, giving her the opportunity to be in a good position to witness them.

American Civil War
The First Battle of Bull Run, also known as First Manassas (the name used by Confederate forces), was fought on July 21, 1861, in Prince William County, Virginia, near the city of Manassas. It was the first major land battle of the American Civil War. Expecting an easy Union victory, the wealthy elite of nearby Washington, including congressmen and their families, had come to picnic and watch the battle. When the Union army was driven back in a running disorder, the roads back to Washington were blocked by panicked civilians attempting to flee in their carriages. Frank Leslie made an engraving of this in the engraving The Soldier in Our Civil War. The Battle of Gettysburg was also spectated by a number of tourists, including Arthur Lyon Fremantle.

Late 19th century
Thomas Cook began promoting tours to the battlefields of the Second Boer War before the conflict had ended. A variety of other travel agents advertised the easily accessible and picturesque battlefields of Tugela and Ladysmith. Groups of tourists also closely followed the Franco-Prussian War visiting the battlefields shortly after the fighting was over. The above were criticized by Alfred Milner, The Observer and Punch.

One of the first travel agents, Henry Gaze, created a tour which included the battlefield of Waterloo in 1854. Waterloo was also a destination of an 1886 Polytechnic Touring Association tour, during which schoolboys and teachers visited the site for educational purposes. According to the 1913 Thomas Cook travel guide, the rising popularity of Waterloo as a tourist attraction led to the appearance of numerous charlatans claiming to have participated in the battle, the guide also highlighted the booming trade of relics and souvenirs related to the engagement.

World War I
Despite the criticism war tourism continued to develop following the pace of the tourism industry in general. At the beginning of World War I it became evident that following the end of the war, the related battlefields would attract considerable attention from potential tourists. Although instances of war tourism during the Great War have been documented, they remained limited due to opposition by the French authorities.

Following the end of the war, previous instances of trophy hunting were replaced by pilgrimage style visits. British intelligence officer Hugh Pollard described the Ypres Salient as a holy ground due to the large number of Entente graves in the region. Numerous veterans echoed those thoughts. Anglican and Catholic religious tourism became increasingly linked with war tourism during the interwar period. In September 1934, 100,000 Catholic former servicemen from both sides of the conflict visited Lourdes in order to pray for peace. A large number of Anglican tourists also undertook tours to the battlefields of the Palestinian campaign. Greece, Turkey and Italy also became popular war tourism destinations.

A large number of battlefield guides were produced by a variety of travel agencies further fueling the rise of war tours. A 1936 study brought to light the fact that the majority of war tourists during the period were driven by curiosity or were paying homage to their deceased relatives. Today, WWI battlefield tourism attracts tens of thousands of tourists to former war zones on the Western Front and in the Dardanelles for example.

World War II
Following the end of World War II former battlefields created new war tourist destinations. Saipan, as well as other battlefields of the Pacific, became a place of pilgrimage for Japanese veterans who reburied and erected monuments to their fallen comrades.

Modern warfare

Foley and Lennon explored the idea that people are attracted to regions and sites where "inhuman acts" have occurred. They claim that motivation is driven by media coverage and a desire to see for themselves, and that there is a symbiotic relationship between the attraction and the visitor, whether it be a death camp or site of a celebrity's death.

21st century
Former security professional Rick Sweeney formed War Zone Tours in 2008, while another of the companies operating in this market was begun by a former New York Times journalist Nicholas Wood. Sweeney is part of a group of tour guides who take tourists to countries that have experienced or are mired in conflict. A tourist on a trip to Baghdad in 2010 might have paid up to $40,000.
2014 reported war tourism was on the increase and included tourists in Israel to spectate on the Syrian Civil War. The desire for the experience and the documentation and photographing of it through social networking could be helping to increase war tourism, according to a Tel Aviv-based journalist. War tourism in Israel is also covered in the 2011 documentary film War Matador by Avner Faingulernt and Macabit Abramson.

In Iran, students, members of Basij militia and interested people are routinely taken to the former battle sites of the Iran–Iraq War as the war is considered by the Iranian ruling regime a "holy defense" and an ideological pillar to the existence of the ruling Islamic Republic. The trips are organized by Basij, an offshoot of the Iranian Revolutionary Guard Corps (IRGC) which enlists the travelers normally in mosques, schools or universities. The trips, which are officially called "Tours for the Travelers of Light" (in ) are low-cost and are taken by bus, under poor safety conditions. Since 2008, the buses taking the "tourists" have caused death to over 75 travelers in about seven trips. in 2013, the then Education Minister Hajibabayi proposed that those killed in these tours be granted the degree of martyr.

In 2022, Canadian politician Dominic Cardy vacationed in Ukraine.  He visited sites that had experienced Russian bombing and damage and shared multiple images and videos to his personal twitter account.

See also
 Dark tourism
 Disaster tourism
 The World's Most Dangerous Places
 Tourism in Syria#After 2011

References

Further reading
 
 Butler, Richard, and Wantanee Suntikul, eds. Tourism and war (Routledge, 2013)
 
 Butler, R., & Suntikul, W. (Eds.). (2013). Tourism and war. Routledge.
 Evanno, Yves-Marie, and Vincent, Johan (eds.), Tourisme et Grande Guerre. Voyage(s) sur un front histoirque méconnu (1914-2019) (Ed. Codex, 2019)
 
 Lisle, Debbie. "Consuming danger: reimagining the war/tourism divide." Alternatives (2000): 91–116. in JSTOR
 
 Weaver, David Bruce. "The exploratory war‐distorted destination life cycle." International Journal of Tourism Research 2.3 (2000): 151–161.
 Winter, Caroline. "Tourism, social memory and the Great War." Annals of Tourism Research 36.4 (2009): 607–626. online

External links

 War Zone Tours
WW2 War Tourism
HA - War Tourism in Bosnia&Herzegovina

Types of tourism
War in popular culture